William Crozier may refer to:
William Crozier (artillerist) (1855–1942), American general, artillerist and inventor
William Crozier (Scottish artist) (1893–1930)
William Crozier (Irish artist) (1930–2011)
William Crozier (cricketer) (1873–1916), Irish cricketer
William Percival Crozier (1879–1944), British journalist and editor
William Crozier (1839–1906), son and heir of John Crozier, South Australian pastoralist
William John Crozier (1892–1955), American physiologist